Kojle is a lake in Suwałki Region, Podlaskie Voivodeship, Poland. It is situated in the Suwaki Landscape Park. It is oval-shaped with numerous bays on the south side. It has a muddy bottom and is overgrown by rushes. Kojle is connected to Perty Lake.

Lakes of Poland
Lakes of Podlaskie Voivodeship